Lyubomir Krastanov was a Bulgarian physical scientist specializing in meteorology, atmospheric physics and fundamental physics. One of the modes for growth of thin films, Stranski–Krastanov growth, is named after him and Ivan Stranski. On the 12th of June 1959 he was elected the deputy president of the Bulgarian academy of sciences.

References

Further reading 
Vesselinov, Markov Ivan. Ivan Stranski-The Grandmaster Of Crystal Growth. World Scientific, 2018.

Bulgarian physicists
Year of birth missing
Year of death missing